Ophthalmocydrus is a monotypic species of beetle in the family Cerambycidae described by Per Olof Christopher Aurivillius in 1925.

References

Pteropliini
Beetles described in 1925
Monotypic beetle genera